Gunnar Kvaran (born 16 January 1944) is an Icelandic cellist.

Life and career
Gunnar was born in the town of Seltjarnarnes near Reykjavík, the son of actor Ævar Kvaran and the great-grandson of Einar Hjörleifsson Kvaran. He began studying the cello with Einar Vigfússon at the age of twelve and went to Copenhagen in 1964 to study with the famous Danish-Icelandic cellist Erling Blöndal Bengtsson at the Royal Danish Academy of Music. Later on he studied with Reine Flachot in Paris and Basel.

In 1988, he established the Reykjavík Trio with Halldór Haraldsson and Guðný Guðmundsdóttir.

For 25 years, Gunnar Kvaran taught at the Reykjavík College of Music, where he headed the department of string instruments. He is now professor of stringed instruments and chamber music in the music department at the Iceland Academy of the Arts, where the Reykjavík Trio is the resident chamber music ensemble.

Awards
 Dr. Gunnar Thoroddsen Fund prize, 1990
 Icelandic Order of the Falcon, 2006

References

Icelandic classical cellists
1944 births
Living people
Royal Danish Academy of Music alumni
Reykjavík College of Music alumni
Reykjavík College of Music people
Gunnar Kvaran